Essex County Council is the county council that governs the non-metropolitan county of Essex in England. It has 75 councillors, elected from 70 divisions, and is currently controlled by the Conservative Party. The council meets at County Hall in the centre of Chelmsford. It is a member of the East of England Local Government Association.

Area and responsibilities
At the time of the 2011 census it served a population of 1,393,600, which makes it one of the largest local authorities in England.  As a non-metropolitan county council, responsibilities are shared between districts (including boroughs) and in many areas also between civil parish (including town) councils.  Births, marriages/civil partnerships and death registration, roads, libraries and archives, refuse disposal, most of state education, of social services and of transport are provided at the county level.

History
The county council was formed in 1889, governing the administrative county of Essex. West Ham, otherwise part of Essex at the time, was a county borough and therefore outside the area of responsibility for the county council. Southend-on-Sea (1914) and East Ham (1915) were also removed. In 1965 Barking, Chingford, Dagenham, Hornchurch, Ilford, Leyton, Romford, Walthamstow, and 'Wanstead and Woodford' were transferred to Greater London. The county council was reconstituted in 1974 as a non-metropolitan county council, regaining jurisdiction in Southend-on-Sea, however the non-metropolitan county was reduced in size in 1998 and the council passed responsibilities to Southend-on-Sea Borough Council and Thurrock Council in those districts. For certain services the three authorities co-operate through joint arrangements, such as libraries and the Essex fire authority.

Following the 2013 County Council elections the Conservative Party retained overall control of the council, but their majority fell from twenty-two to 7 councillors. UKIP, Labour and the Liberal Democrats all won nine seats. Of the three second-placed parties who won nine seats, UKIP gained the largest share of the county-wide vote, more than 10% ahead of the Labour party.[3] The Liberal Democrats remained as the official Opposition, despite winning fewer votes.[3] The Green Party gained two seats on the Council, despite its overall share of the vote falling. The Independent Loughton Residents Association and the Canvey Island Independent Party both returned one member and an Independent candidate representing a residents' association, was also elected. In the 2017 election, 56 Conservatives were elected, 7 Liberal Democrats, 6 Labour, 2 Canvey Island Independent party, 1 Loughton Residents Association, 1 Green and 2 independents. The independents and minor parties have since 2006 generally formed themselves into a political group, known as the Non-aligned group, and duly did so again on 9 May 2017 and 12 May 2021. The Group Leaders are Mike Mackrory (LD), Ivan Henderson (Lab) and Chris Pond (NAG). All 75 members of the Council were thus members of a political group. However, one Conservative was suspended by the national party and thus from the Annual Council Meeting of 2018 sat as an independent. In 2019, another conservative resigned and sat as an independent; she later joined the NAG.

The next election was in 2021.
As a result of these elections, Conservative control was maintained with 52 councillors; the Liberal Democrats had 8, the Labour Party 5, and the independents and minor parties 10. Thus the non-aligned group became the largest on the Council, and provided for the first time the Leader of the Opposition.

The ceremonial county of Essex is divided into 12 district and borough councils with 2 unitary authorities (Southend on Sea and Thurrock). The 12 councils manage housing, local planning, refuse collection, street cleaning, elections and meet in their respective civic offices. The local representatives are elected in parts in local elections, held every year.

The County Council has no say in the work of the two unitary authorities, but works closely with them, including - in the case of Basildon, Brentwood, Castle Point, Rochford, Southend-on-Sea, and Thurrock - through the Association of South Essex Local Authorities.

In late January 2019, Essex County Council was criticised and accused of bigotry for using a picture of a person removing a wig to depict transgender people. The image was placed on a consultation document regarding library cuts.

Young Essex Assembly

The Essex County Council also has a Youth Assembly, 75 members aged between 11 and 19 who aim to represent all young people in their districts across Essex. They decide on the priorities for young people and campaign to make a positive difference. With this, some district and unitary authorities may have their own youth councils, such as Epping Forest, Uttlesford and Harlow.

The elections to the Young Essex Assembly occur in the respective schools in which the candidates are standing. These young people will then go on to represent their school and their entire district.

The initiative seeks to engage younger people in the county and rely on the youth councillors of all status to work closely with schools and youth centres to improve youth services in Essex and help voice concerns of younger people in Essex.

Six of the members will then be voted for by the remaining youth councillors to go to the UK Youth Parliament representing Essex.

Political control

As of 12 May 2021, the composition of the council is as follows:

Notable members
Sir Sydney Walter Robinson (1876–1950), briefly Liberal member of parliament for Chelmsford
Major-General Lord Edward Hay (1888–1944)
Beryl Platt, Baroness Platt of Writtle, Chairman 1971–1980
Robert Dixon-Smith, Baron Dixon-Smith, Chairman 1986–1989
Paul White, Baron Hanningfield, Chairman 1989–1992, Leader 2001–2010
Angela Smith, Baroness Smith of Basildon, member 1989–1993, later member of parliament for Basildon and a peer since 2010

See also
Essex Act 1987
The Association of South Essex Local Authorities

References

External links 
 

 
Local government in Essex
County councils of England
Local authorities in Essex
1889 establishments in England
Local education authorities in England
Major precepting authorities in England
Leader and cabinet executives